The Treshnish Isles are an archipelago of small islands and skerries, lying west of the Isle of Mull, in Scotland. They are part of the Inner Hebrides. Trips to the Treshnish Isles operate from Ulva Ferry, Tobermory, Ardnamurchan and Tiree.

Geography

There are numerous small skerries, particularly north of Lunga. All the islands are of volcanic origin.

History
There are several possible duns on the islands of Iron Age origin. Little is known of the early history, although these prominent landmarks would have been significant waypoints for the Norse settlers during their conquest in the early years of the Kingdom of the Isles, which lasted from the 9th to the 13th centuries.
There are remains on Lunga of a village of blackhouses abandoned in 1857

The Isles were purchased in 1938 by explorer and naturalist Col. Niall Rankin and they were sold to the Hebridean Trust in 2000. The Trust are guardians of the islands to protect them and the wildlife and to monitor and study the ecology and archaeology.

Due to the beauty and remoteness of the Isles and the abundance of wildlife, particularly the puffins, they are very popular with tourists who visit by boat, generally to Lunga, for day-trips during the summer.

Etymology
 is a Gaelic name of unknown meaning that includes the Old Norse root , meaning 'headland'.

The name Fladda originates from the Old Norse for 'flat island'.

Natural history and conservation
The Treshnish Isles are part of the Loch na Keal National Scenic Area, one of 40 in Scotland. They are also designated as a Site of Special Scientific Interest, a Special Protection Area due to their importance for breeding seabirds and a marine Special Area of Conservation. They are also known for their Atlantic grey seals and ruined castles.

See also

 List of islands of Scotland

Notes

References
 
Mac an Tailleir, Iain (2003) "Ainmean-àite le buidheachas/Placenames". Scottish Parliament/Pàrlamaid na h-Alba. (pdf) Retrieved 12 May 2012.
 Treshnish Isles Management Plan 2001-11 (2001) The Hebridean Trust.

External links

The Hebridean Trust

 
Islands of Argyll and Bute
Special Protection Areas in Scotland
Sites of Special Scientific Interest in Mull, Coll and Tiree
Special Areas of Conservation in Scotland
Protected areas of Argyll and Bute
Archipelagoes of Scotland